Carnahan Run is a tributary of the Kiskiminetas River in Armstrong County in the U.S. state of Pennsylvania.

Course

Carnahan Run joins the Kiskiminetas River in Parks Township.

Cleanup

The stream received cleanup as part of the River Sweep of the Ohio River watershed in 2010.

See also 

 List of rivers of Pennsylvania
 List of tributaries of the Allegheny River

References

External links

U.S. Geological Survey: PA stream gaging stations

Rivers of Pennsylvania
Tributaries of the Kiskiminetas River
Rivers of Armstrong County, Pennsylvania